Czimislav was a 9th-century King of the Sorbs. The Saxons won a battle at Kesigesburg and Czimislav was killed in 840. He was part of the Colodici, a Sorbian sub-tribe.

References 

9th-century Slavs
840 deaths
Early Sorbian people
Year of birth unknown
Slavic warriors